Auburn Township is one of the twenty-two townships of Tuscarawas County, Ohio, United States.  The 2000 census found 1,078 people in the township.

Geography
Located in the western part of the county, it borders the following townships:
Sugar Creek Township - north
Dover Township - northeast
York Township - east
Jefferson Township - southeast
Bucks Township - southwest
Clark Township, Holmes County - northwest

No municipalities are located in Auburn Township.

Name and history
Statewide, other Auburn Townships are located in Crawford and Geauga counties.

Government
The township is governed by a three-member board of trustees, who are elected in November of odd-numbered years to a four-year term beginning on the following January 1. Two are elected in the year after the presidential election and one is elected in the year before it. There is also an elected township fiscal officer, who serves a four-year term beginning on April 1 of the year after the election, which is held in November of the year before the presidential election. Vacancies in the fiscal officership or on the board of trustees are filled by the remaining trustees.  The current trustees are Bruce Hanna, Dale Krebs, and Ralph Sundheimer, Jr., and the fiscal officer is Alan Youngen.

References

External links
County website

Townships in Tuscarawas County, Ohio
Townships in Ohio